Kenneth Andrew Jeyaretnam (born 1959) is a Singaporean politician and hedge fund manager who has been serving as the secretary-general of the opposition Reform Party since 2009. 

He is the elder son of J. B. Jeyaretnam, a prominent opposition politician in Singapore who founded the Reform Party in 2008. 

A Cambridge graduate with a double first class honours degree in economics, Jeyaretnam started his career in the financial sector and has worked at Wardley, Continental Bank, Banque Indosuez and Nomura International before becoming a hedge fund manager. 

He took up a more active role in politics after his father's death in 2008 and started leading the Reform Party. Since then, he has contested in the 2011 general election, 2013 by-elections, 2015 and 2020 general election, but lost all of them.

Background 
Jeyaretnam's parents, Joshua Benjamin Jeyaretnam and Margaret Cynthia Walker, were both lawyers by profession. His father was a prominent opposition politician in Singapore and the first elected opposition Member of Parliament since Singapore gained independence in 1965.

Jeyaretnam was educated at St. Andrew's School and the United World College of South East Asia in Singapore before he attended Charterhouse School in England from 1975 to 1977. Between 1977 and 1980, he returned to Singapore for National Service, and then went on to read economics at Queens' College, University of Cambridge, from which he graduated with double first class honours in 1983. He also studied at the Amsterdam Institute of Finance.

After graduating from Cambridge in 1983, Jeyaretnam applied to work at the Monetary Authority of Singapore and other financial institutions and banks, but his applications were turned down. Nevertheless, he managed to start a career in the financial sector as an assistant manager in the Lending Department of Wardley, the merchant banking arm of HSBC. He worked at Continental Bank, Banque Indosuez and Nomura International before he became a hedge fund manager focusing on event-driven investing. From 2004 to 2008, he established and managed his own funds. When he was working in London, he was a committee member of the Singapore UK Association.

Political career 

Following his father's death in September 2008, Jeyaretnam took up a more active role in politics. In April 2009, he became the secretary-general of the opposition Reform Party, founded by his father in 2008 months before his death.

2011 general election 
Jeyaretnam first stood for elections in the 2011 general election when he led a five-member Reform Party team to contest in West Coast GRC against a five-member team from the governing People's Action Party (PAP) led by Trade and Industry Minister Lim Hng Kiang. The Reform Party team lost after garnering 33.43% of the vote against the PAP team's 66.57%.

2013 by-election 
In 2013, after PAP Member of Parliament Michael Palmer resigned from the PAP and gave up his parliamentary seat in Punggol East SMC, a by-election was scheduled to be held on 26 January 2013. Jeyaretnam contested in the by-election, which turned out to be a four-cornered fight pitting him against three other candidates: Koh Poh Koon of the PAP; Lee Li Lian of the Workers' Party; and Desmond Lim of the Singapore Democratic Alliance. The by-election concluded with a victory for Lee, who won with 54.5% of the vote against Koh's 43.73%, Jeyaretnam's 1.2%, and Lim's 0.57%. Since he got lower than 12.5% of the vote, Jeyaretnam forfeited his election deposit of S$14,500 under Singapore's electoral rules.

After his candidacy was first announced, Jeyaretnam and his family in London received multiple death threats, including threats to castrate his son. He made a police report and the police arrested a 23-year-old man working as a clerk in Singapore Press Holdings's classified ads department.

2015 general election 
Jeyaretnam led a four-member Reform Party team to contest in West Coast GRC again during the 2015 general election against a four-member PAP team led by Trade and Industry Minister Lim Hng Kiang. The Reform Party lost with 21.43% of the vote against the PAP team's 78.57%.

2020 general election 
During the 2020 general election, Jeyaretnam switched to leading a five-member Reform Party team to contest in Ang Mo Kio GRC against a five-member PAP team led by Prime Minister Lee Hsien Loong. The Reform Party team lost after garnering 28.09% of the vote against the PAP team's 71.91%.

Personal life 
Jeyaretnam and his wife, Amanda Jeyaretnam, have a son, Jared Jeyaretnam. His younger brother, Philip Jeyaretnam, has been a judge of the Supreme Court since 2021 and was one of the youngest lawyers to be appointed Senior Counsel in 2003 at the age of 38.

References

External links 
 The Reform Party website

1959 births
Living people
Singaporean Anglicans
Saint Andrew's School, Singapore alumni
People educated at Charterhouse School
Singaporean people of Indian descent
Alumni of Queens' College, Cambridge
Singaporean people of English descent
Singaporean people of Sri Lankan Tamil descent
Reform Party (Singapore) politicians
People educated at a United World College